The scholastic dart (Euxoa scholastica) is a moth of the family Noctuidae. It is found from Nova Scotia to Ontario and Wisconsin, south to North Carolina.

The wingspan is about 28 mm. Adults are on wing from July to August.

External links
Images
Bug Guide
The Noctuinae (Lepidoptera: Noctuidae) of Great Smoky Mountains National Park, U.S.A.

Euxoa
Moths of North America
Moths described in 1920